Daniel Robert Ponce de Leon (born January 16, 1992), formerly known as Daniel Poncedeleon, is an American professional baseball pitcher who is a free agent. He previously played in Major League Baseball (MLB) for the St. Louis Cardinals.

Amateur career
Ponce de Leon attended La Mirada High School in La Mirada, California. In 2010, his senior year, he went 6–3 with a 2.95 earned run average (ERA). The Tampa Bay Rays selected him in the 24th round of the 2010 MLB draft, but he did not sign and enrolled at the University of Arizona to play college baseball for the Arizona Wildcats. He pitched only three innings as a freshman, and then transferred to Cypress Junior College for the 2012 season. After that season, he was drafted by the Cincinnati Reds in the 38th round of the 2012 MLB draft, but once again did not sign. After the season, he transferred once again, this time to the University of Houston. In 15 starts for Houston for the 2013 season, he was 7–5 with a 4.47 ERA.

Following the season, Ponce de Leon was drafted by the Chicago Cubs in the 14th round of the 2013 MLB draft and the two parties had reached a deal. However, he failed his physical due to concerns about nerve placement in his elbow and did not sign. Ponce de Leon planned to return to Houston, but the NCAA ruled that he was ineligible to return. He then enrolled at Embry–Riddle Aeronautical University. In 14 starts, he was 9–2 with a 1.60 ERA, holding batters to a .196 batting average.

Professional career

St. Louis Cardinals
After the season, the St. Louis Cardinals drafted Ponce de Leon in the ninth round of the 2014 MLB draft, and he signed.

After signing, Ponce de Leon made his professional debut that same season with the State College Spikes of the Class A-Short Season New York–Penn League. In 12 games (ten starts), he was 3–3 with a 2.44 ERA. In 2015, he pitched for the Peoria Chiefs of the Class A Midwest League and the Palm Beach Cardinals of the Class A-Advanced Florida State League, compiling a combined 11–2 record with a 2.12 ERA and a 1.10 walks plus hits divided by innings pitched in 20 games (19 starts), and in 2016, he pitched for the Springfield Cardinals of the Class AA Texas League, going 9–8 with a 2.53 ERA in 27 starts. He began 2017 with the Memphis Redbirds of the Class AAA Pacific Coast League.

On May 9, 2017, while pitching against Víctor Caratini of the Iowa Cubs, Caratini hit a line drive that struck Ponce de Leon in the head. He had emergency surgery and remained in the hospital for three weeks after the incident. He was cleared for baseball activities in August, but did not return to baseball until spring training 2018. He began 2018 with Memphis.

On June 11, 2018, the Cardinals promoted Ponce de Leon to the major leagues. In 12 games prior to his call-up, he was 5–2 with a Pacific Coast League-leading 2.41 ERA. He did not make an appearance with St. Louis and was optioned to Memphis on June 15. He was recalled again on July 23. He was 9–3 with a 2.15 ERA in 18 games (17 starts) with Memphis. He made his major league debut that night as St. Louis's starting pitcher at Great American Ball Park versus the Cincinnati Reds. In his debut, Ponce de Leon threw seven no-hit innings in which he struck out three and walked three on 116 pitches. He was optioned back to Memphis the next day, and recalled by St. Louis once again on July 27. In total in 2018 for St. Louis, Ponce de Leon made 11 appearances, with four being starts, posting a 0–2 record with a 2.73 ERA in 33 innings pitched.

Ponce de Leon began the 2019 season in Memphis, but was recalled to St. Louis multiple different times before he was called up for the remainder of the year on September 1. Through  innings pitched with St. Louis during the regular season, he went 1-2 with a 3.70 ERA, striking out 52. In a shortened 2020 season, he pitched to a 1-3 record with a 4.96 ERA and 45 strikeouts over nine games (eight starts) and  innings.

Ponce de Leon made 24 appearances with St. Louis in 2021, going 1-1 with a 6.21 ERA and 24 strikeouts. On September 20, 2021, the Cardinals designated Ponce de Leon for assignment. He was subsequently outrighted to the Triple-A West Memphis Redbirds.
The following day, the Cardinals released him.

Los Angeles Angels
On January 25, 2022, Ponce de Leon signed a minor league contract with the Los Angeles Angels. Ponce de Leon was released by the Angels organization on April 4.

Seattle Mariners
On April 9, 2022, Ponce de Leon signed a minor league contract with the Seattle Mariners. He started 16 games for the Triple-A Tacoma Rainiers, struggling to a 5-8 record and 7.95 ERA with 80 strikeouts in 71.1 innings pitched. The Mariners released him on July 20.

Washington Nationals
On July 22, 2022, Ponce de Leon signed a minor league contract with the Washington Nationals organization. He started 7 games for the Triple-A Rochester Red Wings, working to a 1-3 record and 5.65 ERA with 36 strikeouts in 28.2 innings of work. He was released on September 5.

Detroit Tigers 
On September 9, 2022, Ponce de Leon signed a minor league contract with the Detroit Tigers and assigned to the Toledo Mud Hens. He elected free agency on November 10, 2022.

Personal life
Ponce de Leon was born in Anaheim, California, on January 16, 1992, to Ramon and Mary Poncedeleon. He has three sisters. 

He married Jennifer Beatty in February 2018. The couple met while attending Embry–Riddle University. The couple's first child, a son, was born in November 2016. Their second child, a daughter, was born in February 2021.

His surname was originally spelled as one word, Poncedeleon, but he legally changed the spelling to three words, Ponce de Leon, in 2018.

References

External links

1992 births
Living people
People from La Mirada, California
Baseball players from California
Major League Baseball pitchers
St. Louis Cardinals players
Arizona Wildcats baseball players
Cypress Chargers baseball players
Houston Cougars baseball players
Embry–Riddle Eagles baseball players
State College Spikes players
Peoria Chiefs players
Palm Beach Cardinals players
Springfield Cardinals players
Memphis Redbirds players
Tacoma Rainiers players